Robert John Cornell, O.Praem (December 16, 1919 – May 10, 2009) was an American Catholic priest, professor, and politician who served as a member of the United States House of Representatives from Wisconsin from 1975 to 1979.

Early life and education 
Robert John Cornell was born in Gladstone, Michigan, and attended parochial schools in Green Bay, Wisconsin. He earned his B.A. from St. Norbert College (De Pere, Wisconsin) in 1941 and his M.A. and Ph.D. degrees from The Catholic University of America (CUA) in 1957. He wrote his dissertation on the Coal strike of 1902. On June 17, 1944, he was ordained a priest of the Norbertine Order after six years in the order.

Priesthood 
Cornell taught social sciences in parochial schools in Philadelphia, Pennsylvania from 1941 to 1947. He taught at St. Norbert High School, Abbot Pennings High School, and St. Norbert College. He was a professor of history and political science at St. Norbert College from 1947 to 1974, and again from 1979 until 2001.

In the 1960s and 1970s, Cornell organized concerts at the old Brown County Arena (including several that brought Johnny Cash to Green Bay). All proceeds from these concerts benefited local charities.

Political career 
Cornell was the chairman of the Eighth Congressional District of the Democratic Party of Wisconsin and a member of the State Administrative Committee of the Democratic Party of Wisconsin from 1969 to 1974.

He first became involved in partisan politics in 1961 after a local group of affluent Catholic laypeople in Green Bay panned a speech he gave on the importance of promoting social justice. He later wrote in his memoir: "After that incident I decided that speaking or teaching about issues of social justice and human rights would not be sufficient. These stalwarts of the Church obviously felt that matters of self-interest took precedence. I decided that only by advocating public policy was there a hope of making needed changes."
He secured the Democratic nomination after defeating Brown County District Attorney (and now Judge) Donald Zuidmulder with 55% of the primary vote.He was reelected in 1976 to the 95th Congress, becoming the first Democrat to win a second term in what is now the 8th in 62 years. However, he lost to State Representative Toby Roth in 1978 in a bid for the 96th Congress. The Congressional Quarterly Weekly Report (November 18, 1978) reported: "An extremely low turnout among Democratic voters and a strong Republican gubernatorial candidate [Lee S. Dreyfus] were key points in defeat of Robert J. Cornell."

In 1980, he decided to seek a rematch against Roth, but abandoned his bid when the Vatican ordered all priests to withdraw from politics.

While in Congress, Cornell served on the United States House Committee on Education and Labor and the United States House Committee on Veterans' Affairs. In 1978, he worked alongside Sen. William Proxmire to secure passage of the Wisconsin Wilderness Act, which added Whisker Lake and Blackjack Springs Wilderness to the Chequamegon–Nicolet National Forest.

He was the second (after Father Robert Drinan) of only two Roman Catholic priests to serve as a voting representative in the United States Congress.

Later life 
Later in his life, Cornell self-published a memoir entitled Is There A Priest In The House?. The memoir provides an overview of his political career. He focuses primarily on this time in Congress, and discusses many of the issues that he worked on during his tenure. It also includes many witty anecdotes that capture the dry sense of humor that he was known for. Copies of the memoir can be checked out from the Brown County Library System at their Central Library (downtown Green Bay) and Kress Library (De Pere) branches.

Cornell lived in De Pere, Wisconsin, until his death at the age of 89 in 2009.

Cornell is buried on the grounds of the St. Norbert Abbey.

References

External links 

 Profile in the Biographical Directory of the United States Congress
 Inventory of Fr. Robert J. Cornell's Papers (collected by the Wisconsin Historical Society)
 List of Published Works at the Brown County Library
 Green Bay Press Gazette Obituary
 Milwaukee Journal Sentinel Obituary
 Catholic News Service Article from 2007

1919 births
2009 deaths
People from Gladstone, Michigan
20th-century American educators
People from De Pere, Wisconsin
Premonstratensians
St. Norbert College alumni
St. Norbert College faculty
Catholic University of America alumni
Catholics from Wisconsin
Democratic Party members of the United States House of Representatives from Wisconsin
20th-century American politicians
Catholics from Michigan
20th-century American Roman Catholic priests